The 1997–98 Meistriliiga season was the eighth season of the Meistriliiga, the top level of ice hockey in Estonia. Five teams participated in the league, and Kreenholm Narva won the championship.

Regular season

Final 
 Tartu Välk 494 - Kreenholm Narva 3:4 OT

External links
Season on hockeyarchives.info

Meistriliiga
Meist
Meistriliiga (ice hockey) seasons